Randy Alan Cuthbert (born January 16, 1970) is a former professional American football player who spent two seasons in the National Football League after playing at Duke University.  He was born in Lansdale, Pennsylvania.  He played halfback for the Pittsburgh Steelers from 1993 to 1994.  His only NFL carry, a rush for seven yards against the Buffalo Bills during a Monday Night Football game, was telecast as an overhead shot from the Goodyear Blimp, making him the only player in history to have his only rush televised in that manner.

Cuthbert was named the head football coach at Emmaus High School on May 14, 2013, and he served until November 20, 2015, when he was hired as athletic director for Wissahickon High School.

References

External links

1970 births
Living people
People from Lansdale, Pennsylvania
Players of American football from Pennsylvania
American football running backs
Pittsburgh Steelers players
Duke Blue Devils football players